Shisuikai is a faction within the Liberal Democratic Party (LDP). It is led by former LDP secretary-general Toshihiro Nikai. It is considered to be a mid-sized faction. Nikai is considered to be one of the most pro-China lawmakers in Japan, and is also close to LDP's ally, the Komeito.

References 

Political party factions in Japan
1999 establishments in Japan
Liberal Democratic Party (Japan)